Anthony Warlow  (born 18 November 1961) is an Australian  musical theatre performer, noted for his character acting and considerable vocal range. He is a classically trained lyric baritone and made his debut with the Australian Opera in 1980.

Warlow has performed on Broadway, the West End, Carnegie Hall and across Australia with all of the symphony orchestras. His studio recordings have spanned three decades and include solo albums, cast recordings and live performances in concert and with Opera Australia.

He has been honoured as an Australian National Treasure and his achievements have been acknowledged with his investiture as a Member of the Order of Australia (AM) for his services to the performing arts.

Performances

Musical theatre
Warlow's notable musical theatre roles include lead roles in The Phantom of the Opera (as The Phantom), The Secret Garden (as Archibald Craven), Annie (as Daddy Warbucks), Guys and Dolls (as Sky Masterson), My Fair Lady (as Henry Higgins), Jekyll and Hyde (original Gothic thriller cast recording and, for the 25th anniversary, as Dr Henry Jekyll / Edward Hyde), Man of La Mancha (as Don Quixote), A Little Night Music (as Frederik Egerman), Sweeney Todd: The Demon Barber of Fleet Street (as Sweeney Todd), as well as a significant supporting role in Les Misérables (as Enjolras). Circa 1988, he was internationally regarded as the best Enjolras and was honoured by being selected for the complete symphonic recording, along with leading Les Misérables performers from around the world along with fellow Australian actor Philip Quast as Javert. This was arguably his break-through role, as he was cast as the Phantom as the Australian tour of Les Misérables was ending. He performed the role of Doctor Yuri Zhivago in the new musical adaptation of Boris Pasternak's novel Doctor Zhivago. In 2012, Warlow reprised his role as Daddy Warbucks in Annie at the Lyric Theatre, Star City, for a strictly limited season of 12 weeks. Warlow made his debut on Broadway, New York, in the James Lapine-directed role of Daddy Warbucks in Annie at the Palace Theatre. From June to September 2015, he played Charles Frohman/Captain Hook in Finding Neverland on Broadway. From December 2015 to May 2016, he returned to Australia playing the part of Tevye in Fiddler on the Roof.

Warlow performed in Jekyll & Hyde in October 2019 with the Melbourne Symphony Orchestra at the Arts Centre Melbourne and November in Sydney at the ICC Sydney Theatre with the Sydney International Orchestra.

Opera
Warlow's opera roles with Opera Australia include major roles in Die Fledermaus (Gabriel Eisenstein), The Magic Flute (Papageno), A Midsummer Night's Dream (Puck) and The Tales of Hoffmann.

Gilbert and Sullivan
Warlow's Gilbert and Sullivan roles for Opera Australia include the featured comedic role of Ko-Ko in The Mikado (2004–2009), Archibald Grosvenor in Patience (1996), Pirate King in The Pirates of Penzance (2006–2007–2010) and in the 2005 double-bill of Trial by Jury (as the Learned Judge) and H.M.S. Pinafore (as Captain Corcoran). Apart from The Mikado, these Gilbert and Sullivan productions are available on DVD. In 1987, Warlow also performed a one-man show originally written for John Reed, called A Song to Sing, O, about George Grossmith, the comedian who originated the principal comic roles for Gilbert and Sullivan from 1877 through the 1880s.

Other performances
Warlow performed "Advance Australia Fair" at the 1993 NSWRL Grand Final on 26 September 1993 and at the 2008 NRL Grand Final on 5 October 2008.

The Pirates of Penzance tour: 2006–2007
Between 2 August 2006 and 2 June 2007, Warlow appeared in the Opera Australia production of The Pirates of Penzance (a popular Gilbert and Sullivan comic opera), in which he played the role of the "Pirate King" – with performances during 2006 in Sydney, New South Wales (at the Sydney Opera House), in Canberra, Australian Capital Territory and in Brisbane, Queensland (at the Lyric Theatre, Queensland Performing Arts Centre), as well as enjoying full houses in Melbourne, Victoria in 2007.

Warlow's Pirate King appeared in dress, voice and mannerism very similar to Captain Jack Sparrow from Pirates of the Caribbean. In a press interview in Brisbane, Warlow said that he had deliberately based his Pirate King on Johnny Depp's character from Pirates of the Caribbean so that people who may not know the opera but are aware of the Pirates of the Caribbean trilogy of movies could enjoy the opera more. This production of The Pirates of Penzance was shown on television by the Australian Broadcasting Corporation on 9 December 2006. A DVD of the production was subsequently released.

The Phantom of the Opera: 2007–2009
Warlow first portrayed the Phantom in Andrew Lloyd Webber's The Phantom of the Opera in the original Australian production, circa 1990. It was announced in October 2006 that Phantom would re-open in Melbourne the following year and that Warlow had agreed to reprise his role as "The Phantom".

Phantom reopened in Melbourne at the Princess Theatre, its original home, on 19 July 2007. Although he performed for the industry opening night, Warlow was struck down by a bout of influenza that had also claimed many of the other cast and crew, and as a result, he missed the first two and a half weeks of the show's Melbourne season. Understudy Simon Pryce performed in his place until he made his return on 9 August 2007.

Unlike the original Australian Phantom, Warlow played the Phantom for the two-year tour of Australia and New Zealand. The Phantom of the Opera opened at Melbourne's Princess Theatre on 28 July 2007, then at Brisbane's Lyric Theatre in February 2008 followed by Sydney's Lyric Theatre in May 2008. After closing in Sydney on 14 September, the production moved to Auckland, New Zealand and following a holiday break, subsequently opened in Perth in February 2009. The last stop on the tour was Adelaide where Warlow donned the mask for the final time on 23 May 2009. Warlow appeared as a guest at the 25th anniversary production of The Phantom of the Opera at the Royal Albert Hall in London.

Personal life

He was found to be suffering from Non-Hodgkin's Lymphoma in 1992, during the early publicity for the arena production of Jesus Christ Superstar where he was to appear as Pilate. He had to put his career on hold for about a year while he dealt with the disease. He returned to the performance circuit in the second half of 1993 with a national concert tour for the launch of his Back in the Swing album.  He has since done promotional work for the Leukaemia Foundation of Australia.

His fourth solo album, Midnight Dreaming, reached the top ten of the Australian Aria Charts. Warlow also briefly appeared on the ARIA Singles Chart in 1998 with the double A-side single "Beauty School Dropout/My Prayer". Warlow was back on television, in a concert performance, on the night of 24 December 2006 (the concert was shown by the Australian Broadcasting Corporation).

Notable theatre roles 
{| class="wikitable"
|+
!Show
!Role(s)
!Year(s)
!Production
|-
|A Song To Sing, O
|George Grossmith
|1987
|rowspan="2" |Australian
|-
|Les Misérables
|Enjolras
|1988–1990
|-
|The Phantom of the Opera
|The Phantom
|1990–1991
|Australian tour
|-
|Patience
|Archibald Grosvenor
|1995
|Australian
|-
|The Secret Garden
|Archibald Craven
|1995–1996
|Australian tour
|-
|Die Fledermaus
|Gabriel Von Eisenstein
|1997
|Australian
|-
|Annie
| Oliver “Daddy” Warbucks
|2000–2001
|Australian tour
|-
|Trial by Jury
|Learned Judge
|rowspan="2" |2005
|rowspan="2" |Australian
|-
|H.M.S. Pinafore
|Captain Corcoran
|-
|The Pirates of Penzance
|Pirate King
|2006–2007
|rowspan="2" |Australian tour
|-
|The Phantom of the Opera
|The Phantom
|2007–2009
|-
|A Little Night Music
|Fredrik Egerman
|2009
|Australian 
|-
|Doctor Zhivago: The Musical
|Doctor Zhivago
|2011
|rowspan=2|Australian tour
|-
|rowspan="2" |Annie
|rowspan="2" |Oliver “Daddy” Warbucks
|2012
|-
|2012–2014
|Broadway
|-
|Man of La Mancha
|Don Quixote
|2014–2015
|Washington D.C.
|-
|Finding Neverland
|Charles Frohman
Captain Hook
|2015
|Broadway
|-
|Fiddler on the Roof
|Tevye
|2015–2016
|rowspan="4" |Australian tour
|-
| The Wizard of Oz
| Professor Marvel
The Wizard of Oz
|2017–2018
|-
|Sweeney Todd: The Demon Barber of Fleet Street|Sweeney Todd
|rowspan="2" |2019
|-
|Jekyll & Hyde|Dr. Henry Jekyll
Mr. Edward Hyde
|}

Recordings
 Studio albums 

 Live albums 

 Compilation albums 

Charted singles

Cast albums
 Les Misérables – Complete Symphonic Recording (1988)
 Jekyll & Hyde – The Complete Works Recording (1994)
 The Secret Garden – Australian Cast Recording (1995)
 Patience – The Australian Opera (1995) 
 Annie – Australian Cast Recording (2012) 
 Annie – New Broadway Cast Recording (2013)

DVDs
 Patience – Opera Australia production (1996)
 Die Fledermaus – Opera Australia production (1997)
 The Main Event – with John Farnham and Olivia Newton-John (1998)
 H.M.S. Pinafore / Trial by Jury – Opera Australia production (2005)
 The Pirates of Penzance – Opera Australia production (2006)
 The Phantom of the Opera at the Royal Albert Hall (2012)

Awards and nominations
Helen Hayes Award, Washington: Winner (2015): Outstanding Actor in a Musical ("Don Quixote" in  Man of La Mancha)
Drama Desk Award, New York: Nominee (2013): Outstanding Actor in a Musical "Oliver "Daddy" Warbucks" in AnnieGreen Room Awards, Melbourne, Australia
 Winner (1990): Male Actor in a Featured Role – Music Theatre ("Enjolras" in Les Misérables)
 Winner (1991): Male Actor in a Leading Role – Music Theatre ("Phantom" in The Phantom of the Opera)
 Nominee (2001): Male Actor in a Leading Role – Music Theatre ("Oliver "Daddy" Warbucks" in Annie)
Helpmann Awards, Australia
 Nominee (2001): Best Male Actor in a Musical ("Daddy Warbucks" in Annie)
 Nominee (2003): Best Male Actor in a Musical ("Don Quixote" in Man of La Mancha)
 Nominee (2008): Best Male Actor in a Musical ("Phantom" in The Phantom of the Opera)
 Nominee (2011): Best Male Actor in a Musical ("Yuri Zhivago" in Doctor Zhivago)
 Nominee (2012): Best Male Actor in a Musical ("Daddy Warbucks" in Annie)
 Nominee (2016): Best Male Actor in a Musical ("Tevye" in Fiddler on the Roof)Mo Awards
The Australian Entertainment Mo Awards (commonly known informally as the Mo Awards), were annual Australian entertainment industry awards. They recognise achievements in live entertainment in Australia from 1975 to 2016. Anthony Warlow won eleven awards in that time.
 (wins only)
|-
|rowspan="2"| 1990
| Anthony Warlow 
| Musical Theatre Performer of the Year
| 
|-
| Anthony Warlow 
| Male Musical Theatre Performer of the Year
| 
|-
|rowspan="2"| 1991
| Anthony Warlow 
| Musical Theatre Performer of the Year
| 
|-
| Anthony Warlow 
| Male Musical Theatre Performer of the Year
| 
|-
| 1993
| Anthony Warlow 
| Australian Performer of the Year
| 
|-
| 1995
| Anthony Warlow 
| Male Musical Theatre Performer of the Year
| 
|-
|rowspan="2"| 1998
| Anthony Warlow 
| Arena Performer of the Year
| 
|-
| The Main Event (Anthony Warlow, John Farnham and Olivia Newton-John) 
| Australian Performer of the Year
| 
|-
| 2004
| Anthony Warlow
| Australian Performer of the Year
| 
|-
| 2007
| Anthony Warlow 
| Classical / Opera Performer of the Year
| 
|-
| 2008
| Anthony Warlow 
| Classical / Opera Performer of the Year
| 
|-

References

External links

 "Warlow manages success alone", The Age'', 19 April 2009

1961 births
Living people
ARIA Award winners
Australian male musical theatre actors
Australian operatic baritones
People from Wollongong
Members of the Order of Australia
Singers from Sydney
20th-century Australian male opera singers
21st-century Australian male opera singers